Akif Çukurçayır is a Public Administration professor at Selçuk University in Konya, Turkey. His studies mainly focus on governance, citizen centered local politics, local administrations and political participation.

Some of his books:

 M. Akif Çukurçayır vd., (Ed.), Yerel Yönetimlerde Yolsuzlukla Mücadele ve Denetim Sorunları, Mülkiye Teftiş Kurulu Başkanlığı, Ankara, 2012 (Corruption and Audit Problems in Local Governments)
 M. Akif Çukurçayır, Ayşe Tekel (Ed.), Yerel ve Kentsel Politikalar, 2. Baskı, Çizgi Kitabevi, Konya, 2012 (Local and Urban Politics)
 M. Akif Çukurçayır, H. Tuğba Eroğlu (Ed.), Kuramdan Uygulamaya Yönetişim, Çizgi Kitabevi, Konya, 2013 (Governance: Theory and Praxis)
 M. Akif Çukurçayır, Yurttaşsız Demokrasi, Çizgi Kitabevi, 2. Baskı, Konya, 2011 (Democracy without citizen)
 M. Akif Çukurçayır, Yurttaş Odaklı Yerel Yönetim, 3. Baskı, Çizgi Kitabevi, Konya, (Citizen Oriented Local Governments)
 M. Akif Çukurçayır, Yerel Yönetimler-Kuram, Kurum ve Yeni Yaklaşımlar, Çizgi Kitabevi, Konya, 2015. (Local Governments: Theory, Institution, New Approaches)
 M. Akif Çukurçayır, Gülise Gökçe (Ed.), Türk Kamu Yönetiminin Yapısal ve İşlevsel Sorunları, Çizgi Kitabevi, Konya, 2007. (Structural and Functional Problems of Turkish Public Administration)
 M. Akif Çukurçayır, Siyasal Katılma ve Yerel Demokrasi, Çizgi Kitabevi  Yayınları, 4. Baskı, Konya, Şubat 2012. (Political Participation and Local Democracy)
 M. Akif Çukurçayır (Ed.), Küresel Sistemde Siyaset, Yönetim ve Ekonomi, Çizgi Yayınları, Konya, 2003. (Politics, Management and Economy in Global System)
 M. Akif Çukurçayır, H.Tuğba Eroğlu, Hayriye Sağır, Mücahit Navruz, Kamu Yönetiminde Değişimin Rolü ve Etkileri, Bildiriler Kitabı, Konya, 2016, (Public Administration Congress Proceedings Book)
 M. Akif Çukurçayır, Şafak Ünüvar, Alaaddin Başoda, Mehmet Sağır vd, I.Avrasya Turizm Kongresi Bildiriler Kitabı, 2015, Konya. (I.                 Eurasia International Tourism Congress: Current Issues, Trends, And Indicators 28 May 2015, Konya.)

Academic and administrative experiences: 

 Senate membership of Seljuk University: 2011-2016
 Dean of Tourism Faculty: 2012-2016
 Membership of the social sciences commission of Seljuk University: 2011-2015
 Participant in the 8th and 10th Development Plans:2000-2013

Guest Professor:

 Zeppelin University, Friedrichshafen, Germany, 2011 (two months) Beitrag im Rahmen des Sommerfestes der Zeppelin Universität “Bürger.Macht.Staat?“ zum Thema „Demokratisierung der Kommunen in der Türkei“. Von persönlichem Interesse war für 
 M. Akif Çukurçayir auch die Mitwirkung an der Auswahl-kommission im Rahmen der Bewerberauswahl von künftigen Studierenden der Zeppelin Universität und die Teilnahme an der 200-Jahr-Feier der Stadt Friedrichshafen, Deutschland, 2011. Praxis: Kommunale Gemeinschaftsstelle (KGSt), 1997-1998 
            Metropolitan Municipality of Heidelberg, 1997 
Guest Professor for Erasmus Programme: Danibuis University, Galati, Romania, 2015

Bachelor's degree: Public Administration, Ankara University,  Faculty of Political Sciences, 1990
Postgraduate
Public Administration, Selçuk University,  Institute of Social Sciences, 1994
Postgraduate
Public Administration, Deutsche Hochschule Für Verwaltungswissenschaften Speyer (Germany), 1998

Phd
Public Administration(Urbanization and Environmental Problems), Ankara University, Institute of Social Sciences, 1999

 He also  studies urban and environmental issues. 1

References

Living people
Year of birth missing (living people)
Place of birth missing (living people)
Turkish political scientists
Academic staff of Selçuk University